Doi Phu Kha National Park covers a part of 8 districts in the Luang Prabang Range, Nan Province, Northern Thailand and has rich natural resources. It is Northern Thailand's largest National park and rivers such as Nan River and Pua River, have their sources within the area of the range under the protection of the park limits. Khun Nan National Park is located north of the park area.

1,980 m high Doi Phu Kha, located within the parks perimeter, gives its name to the park. There are many caves in the park area. The park is named after chomphu phu kha ( Bretschneidera sinensis), a tree with attractive pink flower bunches, which together with Caryota gigas and Acer wilsonii, are rare species of plant which in Thailand can be found only in this park. There are natural rock formations on 1,837 m high Doi Phu Wae peak. The ascent takes 3 days and 2 nights. The scenery of the sea of mist and the mountain range is the reward for the trekkers who can reach Phu Wae peak.

The park was established on June 17, 1999 with an area of 1,065,000 rai ~ . Doi Phu Kha National Park is part of the Luang Prabang montane rain forests ecoregion.

King Bhumibol Adulyadej has blamed the destruction of Thailand's forested areas on the greed of some state officials. This is evident in large zones of Doi Phu Kha National Park that were formerly covered with virgin forest and that have been deforested even while having national park status.

See also
Thai highlands
 List of national parks in Thailand
 List of Protected Areas Regional Offices of Thailand

References

External links

National Park Division
Birdwatching Doi Phu Kha National Park

National parks of Thailand
Protected areas established in 1999
Luang Prabang Range
Tourist attractions in Nan province
1999 establishments in Thailand